The Walsh River is a river located on the Cape York Peninsula of Far North Queensland, Australia.

It crosses and then runs parallel to the Mareeba-Dimbulah Road then under Mount White and past Fumar and Dimbulah and through the Featherstone Range. It then flows to the north west crossing the Burke Developmental Road and eventually discharges into the Mitchell River of which it is a tributary on the boundary of the localities of Gamboola and Wrotham.

See also

List of rivers of the Queensland

References 

Rivers of Far North Queensland